Justin Randall Timberlake (born January 31, 1981) is an American singer, songwriter, and actor. He is one of the world's best-selling music artists, with sales of over 88 million records. Timberlake is the recipient of numerous awards and accolades, including ten Grammy Awards, four Primetime Emmy Awards, three Brit Awards, nine Billboard Music Awards, the Contemporary Icon Award by the Songwriters Hall of Fame, and the Michael Jackson Video Vanguard Award. According to Billboard, he is the best performing male soloist in the history of the Mainstream Top 40.

Born and raised in Memphis, Tennessee, as a child he appeared on the television shows Star Search and The All-New Mickey Mouse Club. In the late 1990s, Timberlake rose to prominence as one of the two lead vocalists and youngest member of NSYNC, which eventually became one of the best-selling boy bands of all time. Timberlake won two Grammy Awards for his R&B-focused debut solo album Justified (2002) and its single "Cry Me a River". Another single from the album, "Rock Your Body", was also successful.

His critically acclaimed second album FutureSex/LoveSounds (2006), characterized by its diversity in music genres, debuted atop the U.S. Billboard 200 and spawned the Hot 100 consecutive number-one singles with "SexyBack" (featuring Timbaland), "My Love" (featuring T.I.), and "What Goes Around... Comes Around". Established as a solo artist worldwide, his first two albums both exceeded sales of 10 million copies, as he continued producing records and collaborating with other artists.

From 2008 through 2012, Timberlake focused on his acting career, effectively putting his music career on hiatus. He held starring roles in the films The Social Network, Bad Teacher, Friends with Benefits, and In Time.

Timberlake resumed his music career in 2013 with his third and fourth albums The 20/20 Experience and The 20/20 Experience – 2 of 2, exploring neo soul styles, partly inspired by the expansive song structures of 1960s and 1970s rock. The former became the best-selling album of the year and spawned the top three singles "Suit & Tie" (featuring Jay-Z) and "Mirrors". Timberlake voiced Branch in DreamWorks Animation's Trolls (2016), whose soundtrack includes his fifth Billboard Hot 100 chart-topping single, "Can't Stop the Feeling!", which earned him an Academy Award nomination. His fifth studio album Man of the Woods (2018) became his fourth number-one album in the US. Supported by the two top ten singles, "Filthy" and "Say Something" (featuring Chris Stapleton), it concluded 2018 as the sixth best-selling album of the year.

Early life
Justin Randall Timberlake was born on January 31, 1981, in Memphis, Tennessee, the son of Janet Lynn (Bomar) Harless and Charles Randall Timberlake, a Baptist church choir director. Timberlake has two half-brothers, Jonathan  and Stephen, from Charles' second marriage to Lisa Perry. His half-sister Laura Katherine died shortly after birth in 1997, and is mentioned in his acknowledgments in the album NSYNC as "My Angel in Heaven".

His family circle includes several musicians; his grandfather introduced him to music from country music artists like Johnny Cash and Willie Nelson. Performing as a child, Timberlake sang country and gospel music: at the age of 11, he appeared on the television show Star Search, performing country songs as "Justin Randall". By that time, he began listening to rhythm and blues musicians from the 1960s and 70s, such as Al Green, Stevie Wonder and Marvin Gaye, and he had listening sessions with his father of studio albums by the Eagles and Bob Seger.

In 1993 and 1994, he was a Mouseketeer on The All-New Mickey Mouse Club, where his castmates included future girlfriend and singer Britney Spears, future tourmate Christina Aguilera, future bandmate JC Chasez, and future movie actors Ryan Gosling and Keri Russell. Timberlake then recruited Chasez to be in an all-male singing group, put together by Chris Kirkpatrick and financed by boy band manager Lou Pearlman, that eventually became NSYNC.

Career

1995–2002: NSYNC

The boy band NSYNC formed in 1995, and began their career in 1996 in Europe; Timberlake and Chasez served as its two lead singers. In 1998, the group rose to prominence in the United States with the release of their self-titled debut studio album, which sold 11 million copies and included the single "Tearin' Up My Heart". Their second album No Strings Attached (2000) sold 2.4 million copies in the first week, and included a number one single, "It's Gonna Be Me". NSYNC's third album Celebrity (2001) was also financially successful. The group's second and third studio albums spawned top-five singles such as "Bye Bye Bye", "Girlfriend" and "This I Promise You". Upon the completion of the Celebrity Tour, the group went into hiatus in 2002. NSYNC performed at the Academy Awards in 2000, the 2002 Winter Olympics, and the Super Bowl XXXV halftime show. The band sold more than 70 million records worldwide, becoming the fifth-best selling boy band in history.

In 2000, Timberlake appeared in The Wonderful World of Disney movie Model Behavior. He played Jason Sharpe, a model who falls in love with a waitress after mistaking her for another model.

The rise of his own stardom and the general decline in the popularity of boy bands led to the dissolution of NSYNC. Band member Lance Bass was openly critical of Timberlake's actions in his memoir Out of Sync. By 2002, when the group went on a hiatus and members were following individual projects, he partnered with Pharrell Williams of the producing team The Neptunes–and Timbaland to start working on new music. The idea of going solo was strengthened a year earlier. Timberlake originally wrote the single "Gone" around 2001 for Michael Jackson, but he turned the song down, and it was instead recorded by NSYNC. Before its release, however, Jackson contacted him. Timberlake declared in a later interview that the first time he felt confident to go solo happened after that conversation. In a retrospective article in 2020, Billboard considered Celebrity "the group's swan song, setting the stage for Timberlake's equally massive solo career".

2002–2004: Justified and Super Bowl XXXVIII controversy
In August 2002, Timberlake performed at the 2002 MTV Video Music Awards, where he premiered his debut solo single "Like I Love You"; it peaked at number 11 on the Billboard Hot 100 and number two on the UK Singles Chart. His debut solo studio album Justified was released in November and debuted at number two on the Billboard 200 with first-week sales of 439,000 copies, fewer than previous 'N Sync releases. It sold over three million copies in the U.S. and more than ten million copies worldwide. Its R&B influence, provided by hip-hop producers The Neptunes and Timbaland, was complimented by music critics. About the musical direction of the record, he commented, "I just want to do R&B. It's what I grew up listening to". The album spawned the top-five singles "Cry Me a River" and "Rock Your Body".

In summer 2003, Timberlake and Christina Aguilera headlined the Justified/Stripped Tour. Later that year he recorded a song "I'm Lovin' It", used by McDonald's as the theme to its "I'm Lovin' It" campaign. The deal with McDonald's earned Timberlake an estimated $6 million. A tour titled Justified and Lovin' It Live was included with the deal, following his initial Justified World Tour. Timberlake was featured on Nelly's song, "Work It", which was remixed and included on Nelly's 2003 remix album.

Near the end of 2002, Timberlake was the first celebrity to appear on Punk'd, a "candid camera" type show created by Ashton Kutcher to trick celebrities. Timberlake, who cried during the episode, later admitted to being under the influence of cannabis when he was pranked. Three episodes later, he set up Kelly Osbourne to be "punk'd", thus making him the first celebrity to appear on the show more than once. Timberlake later spoofed Ashton Kutcher and Punk'd in a 2003 episode of NBC's Saturday Night Live. Timberlake co-starred in skit titled The Barry Gibb Talk Show alongside comedian Jimmy Fallon, where the duo portrayed Bee Gees brothers Barry and Robin Gibb. It marked the beginning of a long-running friendship and collaboration with Fallon.

In February 2004, during the Super Bowl XXXVIII halftime show, broadcast on the CBS television network from Houston, Timberlake performed with Janet Jackson before a television audience of more than 140 million viewers. At the end of the performance, as the song drew to a close, Timberlake tore off a part of Jackson's black leather costume in a "costume reveal" meant to accompany a portion of the song lyrics. Jackson's representative explained Timberlake intended "to pull away the rubber bustier to reveal a red lace bra. Part of the costume detached, and Jackson's breast was briefly exposed. Timberlake apologized for the incident, stating he was "sorry that anyone was offended by the wardrobe malfunction during the halftime performance of the Super Bowl..." The phrase "wardrobe malfunction" has since been used by the media to refer to the incident and has entered pop culture. Timberlake and Jackson were threatened with exclusion from the 2004 Grammy Awards unless they agreed to apologize on screen at the event. Timberlake attended and issued a scripted apology when accepting the first of two Grammy Awards he received that night (Best Pop Vocal Album for Justified and Best Male Pop Vocal Performance for "Cry Me a River"). He had also been nominated for Album of the Year for Justified, and Record of the Year along with Best Rap/Sung Collaboration for "Where Is the Love?" with The Black Eyed Peas.

2004–2007: Acting and FutureSex/LoveSounds
After the Super Bowl incident, Timberlake put his recording career on hold to act in several films, having starred in a few feature films earlier in his career. The first role he took during this time was as a journalist in Edison Force, filmed in 2004 and received a direct-to-video release on July 18, 2006. He also appeared in the films Alpha Dog, Black Snake Moan, Richard Kelly's Southland Tales, and voiced Prince Artie Pendragon in the animated film Shrek the Third, released on May 18, 2007. He also appeared as a young Elton John, in the video for John's song "This Train Don't Stop There Anymore". Timberlake was considered to play the role of Roger Davis in the film version of the rock musical Rent, but director Chris Columbus had insisted that only the original Broadway members could convey the true meaning of Rent, so the role was reprised by Adam Pascal.

He continued to record with other artists. After "Where Is the Love?", he again collaborated with the Black Eyed Peas on the 2005 track "My Style" from their album Monkey Business. When recording the 2005 single "Signs" with Snoop Dogg, Timberlake discovered a throat condition. Nodules were subsequently removed from his throat in an operation that took place on May 5, 2005. He was advised not to sing or speak loudly for at least a few months. In 2005, he began his own record company, JayTee records.

Timberlake released his second studio album, FutureSex/LoveSounds, on September 12, 2006. The album, which Timberlake created from 2005 to 2006, debuted at number-one on the Billboard 200 album chart, selling 684,000 copies its first week. It became the biggest album for pre-orders on iTunes, and beat Coldplay's record for the biggest one-week sales of a digital album. The album was produced by Timbaland and Danja (who produced a bulk of the album), will.i.am, Rick Rubin and Timberlake himself, and features guest vocals by Snoop Dogg, Three 6 Mafia, T.I. and will.i.am. A studio representative described it as being "all about sexiness" and aiming for "an adult feel".

The album's lead single, "SexyBack", was performed by Timberlake at the opening of the 2006 MTV Video Music Awards and reached number-one on the Billboard Hot 100, where it remained for seven consecutive weeks. "My Love", the album's second single, also produced by Timbaland and featuring rapper T.I., reached number-one on the Hot 100, as did third single "What Goes Around... Comes Around". The song is reported to have been inspired by the break-up of his childhood friend and business partner, Trace Ayala, with actress Elisha Cuthbert. In October 2006, Timberlake said that he would focus on his music career rather than his film roles, specifying that leaving the music industry would be a "dumb thing to do at this point". He was the special guest performer at the 2006 Victoria's Secret Fashion Show where he sang "SexyBack", "My Love" and "LoveStoned".

Timberlake hosted many music events, including the European MTV Music Awards in 2006. On December 16, 2006, Timberlake hosted Saturday Night Live, doing double duty as both host and musical guest for the second time. During this appearance, he and Andy Samberg performed an R&B song for a skit titled "Dick in a Box", which some radio stations aired as an unofficial single from Timberlake. Called "one of the most iconic musical moments in the show's history" by Billboard, it became a viral hit and one of the most viewed videos on YouTube at the time. Rolling Stone listed the skit at number three on their "50 Greatest 'Saturday Night Live' Sketches of All Time". The song earned him an Emmy Award and was later featured on The Lonely Island's debut album Incredibad.

In January 2007, Timberlake embarked on the FutureSex/LoveShow tour. Following singles off the album, "LoveStoned/I Think She Knows (Interlude)" and "Until the end of Time", peaked within the top 20 on the Hot 100, while the sixth single "Summer Love" reached the top 10. The song "Give It to Me", a Timbaland single on which Timberlake guests with Nelly Furtado, reached the Hot 100 number-one spot. Eventually, FutureSex/LoveSounds was added to the Rock and Roll Hall of Fame's musical library and archive.

2008–2012: Musical hiatus and focus on acting
The song "4 Minutes" was first played by Timbaland at Philadelphia's Jingle Ball on December 17, 2007. When released on March 17, 2008, "4 Minutes" was revealed to be a duet between Timberlake and Madonna, with backing vocals by Timbaland. It was lead single from Madonna's eleventh studio album Hard Candy, which featured four other song-writing collaborations with Timberlake, being also one of the executive producers. The single was an international hit, topping the charts in over 21 countries worldwide. Timberlake also appears in the music video, which was directed by Jonas & François. On March 30, 2008, Timberlake performed the song at Madonna's Hard Candy Promo Show at Roseland Ballroom in New York City. On November 6, 2008, Timberlake performed the song with Madonna on the Los Angeles stop of her Sticky & Sweet Tour.

In June 2007, Timberlake co-wrote, produced and provided vocals for the songs "Nite Runner" and "Falling Down" for Duran Duran's album Red Carpet Massacre, released on November 13, 2007. "Falling Down" was released as a single in the UK on the previous day. Also in 2007, Timberlake made an appearance on 50 Cent's third album Curtis. Timberlake, along with Timbaland, is featured on a track called "Ayo Technology", which was the album's fourth single. Also, another possible collaboration was to occur with Lil Wayne for his album Tha Carter III with Nelly Furtado and Timbaland. With the wrapping up of the FutureSex/LoveSounds tour of Australasia and the Middle East in November 2007, Timberlake resumed his film career. Projects underway early in 2008 were starring roles in Mike Myers' comedy The Love Guru (released June 20, 2008) and Mike Meredith's drama The Open Road (released August 28, 2009). In March 2008, it was announced that he would be an executive producer in an American adaptation of the hit Peruvian comedy My Problem with Women for NBC. On November 20, 2008, TV Guide reported that Timberlake's next single, "Follow My Lead", which also featured vocals by Timberlake's protégée, former YouTube star Esmée Denters, would be available for exclusive download through Myspace. All proceeds would go to Shriners Hospitals for Children, a charity dedicated to improving pediatric care for sick children. In February 2008, Timberlake was awarded two Grammy Awards. At the 50th Grammy Awards ceremony, he won the Award for Best Male Pop Vocal Performance for "What Goes Around...Comes Around", and the Award for Best Dance Recording for "LoveStoned/I Think She Knows".

In 2008, a collaboration between Timberlake and T.I., "Dead and Gone", was featured on T.I.'s sixth studio album, Paper Trail, and was released as its fourth single late in 2009. In November 2008, it was confirmed that Timberlake would make a guest appearance and produce some tracks on R&B/pop singer Ciara's upcoming album Fantasy Ride due out May 5, 2009. Timberlake featured on Ciara's second single "Love Sex Magic", the video being shot on February 20, 2009. The single became a worldwide hit, reaching the top ten in numerous countries and peaking at number-one in several countries including Taiwan, India, and Turkey. The song was nominated for Best Pop Collaboration with Vocals at the 52nd Grammy Awards. Timberlake hosted the 16th ESPY Awards, and the musical number "I Love Sports" was later nominated for an Emmy award. Timberlake and his production team The Y's, along with Mike Elizondo, produced and co-wrote the song "Don't Let Me Down" for Leona Lewis's second studio album, Echo, released on November 17, 2009. Timberlake also co-wrote and performed on "Carry Out", the third single from Timbaland's album Shock Value II, released on December 1, 2009. Timberlake appeared on Jimmy Fallon's debut as host of Late Night with Jimmy Fallon on March 2, 2009. Timberlake was the executive producer on the MTV reality series The Phone, which premiered on April 21, 2009. In late 2009, Barbadian singer Rihanna released the album Rated R, with Timberlake being one of the writers and producers. They both worked together previously for her third studio album Good Girl Gone Bad.

From 2010, Timberlake increased his acting work. He played Sean Parker, the founder of Napster, in the acclaimed film The Social Network (2010). He also appeared at the 2010 MTV VMAs on September 12, 2010. In 2011, he starred alongside Cameron Diaz in Bad Teacher and alongside Mila Kunis in Friends with Benefits, and played Will Salas, the protagonist of In Time, a science fiction film by Andrew Niccol. He provided a feature and appeared in the music video for the song "Motherlover" from The Lonely Island's second album Turtleneck & Chain, and directed and made a cameo in the FreeSol music video "Hoodies On, Hats Low", which was released in August 2011. The Late Night with Jimmy Fallon sketch "History of Rap" was performed for the first time by both Fallon and Timberlake in 2010. In July 2011, United States Marine Kelsey De Santis uploaded a YouTube video asking Timberlake to be her date to the United States Marine Corps birthday ball; they attended the event on November 13, 2011, in Richmond, Virginia. His fifth Saturday Night Live episode, as host and musical guest, was the most-watched episode since January 7, 2012, with Charles Barkley as host and Kelly Clarkson as musical guest.

2013–2017: The 20/20 Experience, 2 of 2, and Trolls

Timberlake began working on his third studio album The 20/20 Experience in June 2012 with "no rules and/or end goal in mind". He publicly announced his return to the music industry in January 2013, releasing the album's lead single "Suit & Tie" featuring Jay-Z later that month, which would eventually peak at number three on the Billboard Hot 100. After four years not performing in concert, Timberlake appeared the night before the 2013 Super Bowl and performed during the "DirecTV Super Saturday Night" on February 2, 2013, in New Orleans. On February 10, 2013, he performed "Suit & Tie" with sepia-toned lighting at the 55th Annual Grammy Awards, with Jay-Z joining him from the audience. On February 11, 2013, "Mirrors" was released as the second single from The 20/20 Experience. The song would eventually peak at number two on the Billboard Hot 100 and number-one on the UK Singles Chart. The 20/20 Experience was released on March 19, 2013 through RCA Records due to the disbandment of Jive Records. The album set a digital sales record for being the fastest-selling album on the iTunes Store and debuted at number-one on the charts by moving just over 968,000 copies in the U.S., the biggest sales week of 2013. It eventually became the best-selling album of the year in the country.

Timberlake performed at the "In Performance at the White House: Memphis Soul" concert, held in the East Room of the White House and hosted by President Barack Obama, celebrating Memphis soul music from the 1960s. Afterward, Timberlake officially announced The 20/20 Experience World Tour, following his and Jay-Z's co-headlining concert tour Legends of the Summer Stadium Tour. Timberlake also appeared on Jay-Z's twelfth studio album Magna Carta... Holy Grail on three songs: "Holy Grail", "BBC" (along with Nas, Swizz Beatz, Timbaland, Pharrell Williams, Niigo & Beyoncé), and "Heaven". On August 25, 2013, Timberlake received the Michael Jackson Video Vanguard Award at the 2013 MTV Video Music Awards. He also took home three competitive awards, including Video of the Year for "Mirrors". During his performance, Timberlake briefly reunited with his former NSYNC bandmates for a medley of their hit songs "Girlfriend" and "Bye Bye Bye".

Timberlake's fourth studio album The 20/20 Experience – 2 of 2 was released on September 30, 2013 and debuted at number-one on the Billboard 200. Its lead single "Take Back the Night" was released on July 12, 2013, following by the second single "TKO". Timberlake was given a production and writing credit on track six on Beyoncé's self-titled fifth studio album, which was released in December 2013. At the 57th Annual Grammy Awards, Timberlake was nominated for seven awards, eventually winning three: Best R&B Song for "Pusher Love Girl", Best Rap/Sung Collaboration for "Holy Grail", and Best Music Video for "Suit & Tie", which was directed by The Social Network director David Fincher. On February 25, 2014, "Not a Bad Thing" was released as the third single from The 20/20 Experience - 2 of 2. The song reached the top 10 on the Hot 100 and topped the Mainstream Top 40 chart. In 2014, Timberlake appeared on Michael Jackson's second posthumous record Xscape on the song "Love Never Felt So Good", which was produced by Timbaland, Jerome "J-Roc" Harmon and Timberlake. On May 14, 2014, a music video was also released featuring clips of Jackson, with Timberlake accompanied by several of Jackson's fans performing some of Jackson's signature moves. The video was directed by Timberlake and Rich Lee. During 2015, Timberlake performed along with Jimmy Fallon the Saturday Night Live 40th Anniversary's cold open, returned to The Tonight Show Starring Jimmy Fallon as a guest to perform a sixth edition of the sketch "History of Rap", and performed along with Chris Stapleton at the 49th Annual Country Music Association Awards.

Showcasing the final date of The 20/20 Experience World Tour at Las Vegas' MGM Grand Garden Arena, the space-age themed concert film titled Justin Timberlake + The Tennessee Kids and directed by Jonathan Demme premiered at the 2016 Toronto International Film Festival on September 13. Timberlake dedicated the film to Prince for influencing his music. Ahead of its debut at the film festival, the streaming service Netflix released it on October 12. Timberlake composed the soundtrack and served as music supervisor for the 2017 film The Book of Love, which his wife Jessica Biel produced and starred in.

Timberlake voiced the lead character in DreamWorks Animation's musical comedy Trolls opposite Anna Kendrick. The film was released in November 2016, and returned for its sequel Trolls: World Tour in 2020. He also served as the executive music producer, performing original music for the film. The lead single, "Can't Stop the Feeling!", was released on May 6, 2016. Timberlake was invited by Swedish broadcaster Sveriges Television (SVT) to perform "Can't Stop the Feeling" live during the interval act at the grand finale of the Eurovision Song Contest 2016 on May 14, 2016. The single debuted at number one on the U.S. Billboard Hot 100, and reached the top spot in other 16 countries. It became his eighth U.S. Mainstream Top 40 number-one song. It became the best-selling song of the year in the U.S. with 2.4 million downloads sold. On February 26, 2017, Timberlake opened the 89th Academy Awards with a performance of "Can't Stop the Feeling!", since the song earned him a nomination. Also that year, Timberlake starred with Kate Winslet and Juno Temple in Woody Allen's drama film Wonder Wheel, and headlined several festivals and live sets, including Rock in Rio, the United States Grand Prix, and the Pilgrimage Music & Cultural Festival, which he co-produced.

2018–present: Man of the Woods and Super Bowl LII halftime show

Speaking of his fifth studio album in 2016, Timberlake stated, "I think where I grew up in America has a lot of influence. Growing up in Tennessee—very central of the country—Memphis is known as the birthplace of rock & roll, but also the home of the blues, but Nashville's right down the street so there's a lot of country music." In following interviews, Timberlake confirmed working with producers Timbaland and Pharrell Williams, while stating, "It sounds more like where I've come from than any other music I've ever made... It's Southern American music. But I want to make it sound modern – at least that's the idea right now."

His fifth studio album Man of the Woods was released on February 2, 2018, two days before he headlined the Super Bowl LII halftime show in Minneapolis, Minnesota on February 4, where Timberlake performed a medley of his songs featuring both the Tennessee Kids and the Minnesota Marching Band alongside him, as well as a duet of "I Would Die 4 U" with a video projection of late singer Prince on screen. The show contained multiple selections from Man of the Woods, which is named after his son Silas, whose name means "from the forest". The album's first single, "Filthy", was released on January 5, along with its accompanying video directed by Mark Romanek. The electro-funk song has reached number nine in the US and number 5 in Canada. The songs "Supplies", "Say Something" featuring Chris Stapleton and "Man of the Woods" were also released along with music videos ahead of the album. His collaboration with Stapleton also reached the top 10 in the US and Canada.

Man of the Woods topped the Billboard 200 with the biggest first week sales of the year at the time, selling 293,000 total units. Man of the Woods also marks Timberlake's fourth consecutive No. 1 album and has since been certified Gold by the Recording Industry Association of America (RIAA). Man of the Woods concluded 2018 as the sixth best-selling album of the year. An accompanying tour of the same name began on March 13, 2018, in Toronto, Canada and concluded on April 13, 2019, in Uncasville. The Man of the Woods Tour was the sixth-highest-grossing tour of 2018.

In May 2019, Timberlake received an honorary doctorate from Berklee College of Music. Missy Elliott and Alex Lacamoire also received doctorates at the ceremony.

Following the announcement of Trolls World Tour, Timberlake teased potential collaborations with a number of artists, through a series of Instagram posts, which included frequent collaborators Pharrell Williams, Nathaniel Hills and Rob Knox, as well as new collaborators such as Anderson. Paak, Brandy Norwood, Lizzo, and Meek Mill. On February 26, 2020, SZA and Timberlake released the single "The Other Side", a song part of the Trolls World Tour soundtrack, alongside its music video. On March 9, 2020, Timberlake released a teaser for his upcoming song "Don't Slack", which features Anderson. Paak, and is also part of the Trolls World Tour soundtrack. The song was released on March 10, 2020.

In September 2020, Timberlake and producer Timbaland teased a potential upcoming collaboration with Canadian musician Justin Bieber, as well as collaborations with Justine Skye, Hit-Boy and Ty Dolla $ign. In December 2020, Timberlake and Ant Clemons released the single "Better Days", which received its premier on the Rock The Runoff virtual concert, held by Stacey Abrams' organization Fair Fight.

In January 2021, Timberlake performed as part of the Inauguration of Joe Biden. Performing from his hometown of Memphis, Timberlake performed his collaboration with Ant Clemons during the Celebrating America special. Timberlake performed at Pharrell Williams' Something in the Water festival in Washington D.C., where he was joined on stage by T.I. and Clipse for his five-song set.

Personal life

Relationships and children
In early 1999, Timberlake began dating fellow former The All-New Mickey Mouse Club cast member and singer Britney Spears. Their relationship ended abruptly in March 2002. Both Spears and Timberlake graduated high school via distance learning from the University of Nebraska High School; Timberlake received his diploma onstage during a concert in Memphis in 2000. In 2003, he was briefly linked to British singer Emma Bunton. In April 2003, he began dating actress Cameron Diaz soon after they met at the Nickelodeon Kids' Choice Awards. After much speculation of breakups throughout their relationship, the couple split in December 2006 shortly after she introduced him as a musical guest on Saturday Night Live.

In January 2007, Timberlake began dating actress Jessica Biel. They became engaged in December 2011 and married on October 19, 2012, at the Borgo Egnazia resort in Fasano, Italy. Their first son was born in April 2015. In July 2020, they had a second child, a son.

Residences
In July 2002, Timberlake purchased a  square foot mansion in Hollywood Hills for $8.3 million from Helen Hunt. In 2010, Timberlake purchased a unit at 311 West Broadway in SoHo, formerly owned by Oscar de la Renta, for $6.56 million. He sold the unit in 2018 for $6.35 million, incurring a loss.

In 2015, Timberlake bought a house in the Yellowstone Club near Big Sky, Montana. In May 2017, Timberlake, and his wife, Jessica Biel, paid $20.2 million for a  penthouse unit at 443 Greenwich Street in Tribeca, Manhattan.

Earnings
Forbes began reporting on Timberlake's earnings in 2008, calculating that he earned $44 million between June 2007 and June 2008 for his music, tour, commercials, and hospitality, making him the world's 4th best-paid music personality at the time, above Madonna and Celine Dion. That year, he was ranked twelfth on the Forbes Celebrity 100 list and second on the "Best-Paid Celebrities Under 30" list.

According to Billboard, Timberlake was the third highest-paid musician of 2013, with earnings of $31 million. He was ranked 26th with earnings of $57 million on the Celebrity 100 list for 2014, and 19th on the 2015 list with $63 million. Timberlake was listed at number three on the Billboard Money-Makers List of 2014.

He was ranked 41st on the 2019 Celebrity 100 list by Forbes, with earnings of $57.5 million in 2019.

Artistry

Timberlake possesses a lyric tenor vocal range. Primarily an R&B album, his debut Justified also contains influences of dance-pop, funk and soul music. During the production of FutureSex/LoveSounds, Timberlake was interested in rock music. This inspiration was used in his approach in recording the songs, rather than in composing them. Timberlake reveals, "I wanted to sing the song like a rock and roll singer, not an R&B singer." On the influences he drew from, he said that if Justified was "characterized" by Michael Jackson and Stevie Wonder, FutureSex/LoveSounds is more like David Bowie and Prince. Other influences include late INXS-frontman Michael Hutchence, Arcade Fire, David Byrne, The Killers, The Strokes, and Radiohead. He began including beatboxing in his records near the end of his boyband era and into his emergence as a solo act, this includes songs from Justified and FutureSex/LoveSounds.

Unlike his previous record primarily focused on R&B and pop genres, FutureSex/LoveSounds is less concentrated on one particular sound, thus representing a wider range. Timberlake explains, "It's more broad as far as the styles I wanted to mix in to my own type of thing." A musically "complex" album, FutureSex/LoveSounds is a fusion of rap, rock, funk, soul, gospel, new wave, opera, and world music, characterized by preludes and interludes interspersed on the album's tracks. Entertainment Weekly noted that the album's sound is a "sonic departure" from both NSYNC and Justified. Although "What Goes Around" sounds similar to Justified, Timberlake admitted that it is the only song in the new album to have such similarity.

The 20/20 Experience is a neo soul album partly inspired by the expansive song structures of 1960s and 1970s rock. Mikael Wood of the Los Angeles Times found its elaborate structures ambitious in the vein of Stevie Wonder, Prince, and Michael Jackson. Since his marriage, he incorporated themes of romance in his songwriting, as Complex noted, showing that he "writes his tracks on his emotions, leaving him with a career of personal albums". Moments of emotional pain after betrayal influenced the songwriting of some previous records.

Longtime critic Robert Hilburn for the Los Angeles Times praised Timberlake's act after attending the Justified and Stripped Tour in 2003, considering him "born for the stage (with) the savvy instincts to put together a show that works. Rather than make himself the constant center of attention, he was comfortable enough at times simply to be part of a talented ensemble." In 2013, Timberlake introduced his big-band orchestra called the Tennessee Kids for Legends of the Summer and The 20/20 Experience World Tour which includes guitarists, dancers, background singers, drummers, bassists, keyboardists, trumpeters, a music coordinator, a percussionist, a saxophonist, among other musicians. The 20/20 Experience allowed Timberlake to throw back to the big band era, its stage production embraced a vintage sheen and everyone in classic suits. For the tour, Timberlake had The Regiment Horns, a horn section, onstage with him. Emily Zemler of The Hollywood Reporter described him as a performer who is "genuinely having fun", whereas Jon Pareles of The New York Times commented that the singer "reveals something darker, more fiery and intense" while performing post-breakup revenge songs, such as "Cry Me a River" and "What Goes Around... Comes Around". Billboard editor Phil Gallo praised Timberlake's medley performance at the 2013 MTV Video Music Awards, saying he "gave the show its heart and center", also mentioning his place as a modern recording artist and a solid link in the lineage of the most acclaimed performers in the show's history. The New York Times editor Katie Rogers highlighted Timberlake's crossover appeal after his performance with Chris Stapleton at the 2015 Country Music Association Awards. Described by critics as a "consummate showman", Timberlake usually plays guitar, piano and keyboard in his shows.

Public image

Timberlake's fashion and style evolution, from "boy-band synchronized wardrobe days" to "a notable source of fashion inspiration to men all over", has been noticed by the media. As noted by a Billboard editor, "Since his solo career began with the 2002 release of debut album Justified, Timberlake has honed his unique sense of style", while citing Elvis Presley, Johnny Cash, Jerry Lee Lewis and Frank Sinatra as style influences: "guys who were just really never trying to be that [stylish], they just were that". According to American fashion designer Tom Ford, who has dressed Timberlake since 2011 and created more than 600 exclusive pieces for The 20/20 Experience World Tour, Timberlake "has a kind of effortless cool that makes classic menswear tailoring modern".

The New York Times''' editor Sia Michel wrote in 2007, "Since his last tour, for 2002's multiplatinum Justified, he has learned how to project sex-symbol edge" adding "he's a rock star who can commit." Napster's founder Sean Parker, portrayed by Timberlake in The Social Network, stated "I don't think I look anything like Timberlake, but it's not so bad being played by a sex symbol." In Nielsen Music's U.S. report for 2015, Timberlake led the "Top 10 Musicians Among Millennials" list. Wax statues of Timberlake are on display at the Madame Tussauds wax museums in New York, Las Vegas, Hollywood, Nashville, Berlin, Amsterdam, and London. His costume for the Saturday Night Live skit "Dick in a Box" is displayed at "Saturday Night Live: The Exhibition" in New York.

After New York legalized same-sex marriage in 2011, he voiced his support for LGBT equality in the U.S., stating, "We're people and we're different, all of us. And we should be using our differences to bring ourselves closer together." Timberlake and his wife Jessica Biel received the Inspiration Award at the GLSEN Respect Awards in 2015, with the executive director saying, "They are two vocal and committed allies to the LGBT community who are also devoted to charitable works that improve the lives of youth."

Influenced by the national attention received by Timberlake's selfie inside a voting booth shared on Instagram during the 2016 presidential election, which was at the moment an illegal act, Senator Brian Kelsey of Germantown, Tennessee brought up a bill that would allow taking photos in voting poll stations, with some exceptions against bad procedures. It was later approved by the Tennessee Senate.

Following the release of Framing Britney Spears, public attention was brought to old comments Timberlake made to describe his relationship with Britney Spears following their breakup, with some considering them to contain misogynistic rhetoric. He was 21 at the time. It also led to renewed interest in his participation in the Super Bowl XXXVIII halftime show controversy, where he exposed Janet Jackson's breast on live television. Following much public pressure, Timberlake issued a public apology on his Instagram page, writing he "benefited from a system that condones misogyny and racism" and "I do not want to ever benefit from others being pulled down again.". He finished by saying "I care deeply about the wellbeing of the people I love and have loved. I can do better and I will do better". Public scrutiny surrounding the Super Bowl XXXVIII incident was raised when a stylist alleged Timberlake had planned to expose Jackson during the performance in advance. This, however, is contradictory to statements made by several sources related to the halftime show. Salli Frattini, the first woman to produce a halftime show and a producer for the show, stated in 2018 that the production team experimented with removing elements of clothing in rehearsal, and that Jackson's team again pitched the idea to Justin prior to the show.

In June 2021, Timberlake spoke out in support of Britney Spears during her court battle over her conservatorship. Timberlake wrote on his Twitter that "No woman should ever be restricted from making decisions about her own body [...] [Jessica Biel] and I send our love, and our absolute support to Britney during this time. We hope the courts, and her family make this right and let her live however she wants to live".

 Legacy 

Timberlake has been referred to as the "President of Pop" and "Prince of Pop" by contemporary journalists. In a 2016 article of The Hollywood Reporter, editor Scott Feinberg stated Timberlake is "widely regarded as one of the greatest all-around entertainers in the history of show business".

In 2003, Rolling Stone named him the biggest pop star of the year and featured him on the magazine's cover, commenting that he "attained the one thing most pop stars don't, and the one thing he wanted more than anything else: credibility". For Entertainment Weekly his second studio album, FutureSex/LoveSounds, "redefined pop's cutting edge"; for Vibe it "pushed boundaries more forcefully" than works by his male contemporaries. Fuse TV's editor Jason Lipshutz stated it "changed the game. [The album] was steely and sweaty, a universal dance opus that made room for intimacy. It had the best first half of any pop album in 25 years. You have to go back to 1979 for Off the Wall, to find a pop album with a first half that matches up." He was ranked 66th on the VH1 100 Greatest Artists of All-Time. Timberlake appeared for the first time on the Time 100 list of most influential people by Time in 2007. In 2013, he made his second appearance on the 100 list, with Stevie Wonder writing "Justin has accomplished a lot at a young age, taking advantage of all the possibilities, and yet he's found time to give of himself too—he gets and gives back. He has a spirit. He does God's work through using the most of his talent."Justifieds single "Cry Me a River" was ranked at number 20 on Rolling Stone's 100 Best Songs of the 2000s, and one of their 500 greatest songs of all time. Marilyn Manson further cited it as one of the main songs that influenced him. Billboard editor Jason Lipshutz named the song's music video "one of the more brilliant musical moments in pop music since the dawn of the century". His second album FutureSex/LoveSounds was placed at 46 on Rolling Stone's 100 Best Albums of the 2000s, the ninth best album of the decade for Entertainment Weekly, and the greatest of the decade for Vibe. The lead single, "SexyBack", helped introduce EDM sounds to top 40 radio, as it brought together variations of electronic dance music with Timberlake's R&B tone. Aside from earning critical acclaim for its parent album, Sia Michel of The New York Times noted that he was responsible for popularizing in 2006 the catchphrase "I'm bringing sexy back".

Considered a pop icon by media outlets, his work has influenced numerous artists, including Justin Bieber, Shawn Mendes, Olly Murs, Maroon 5, Britney Spears, Lorde, Joe Jonas, Thomas Rhett, Ed Sheeran, Jason Derulo, Tori Kelly, Liam Payne, Bridgit Mendler, Hunter Hayes, BoA, Seungri, Taeyang, Rain, Lloyd Banks, Maluma, Rosalía, and Jungkook. Bieber and Nick Jonas have cited him as one of their role models, with the latter stating is for "not only transitioning from where he started, but also balancing acting and singing". Christian hip hop artist tobyMac has stated Timberlake's work inspires him, commenting "he's setting himself up to be a classic, making decisions and moving on them. That's a great place to be." In the context of male artists that achieved commercial success after leaving their boy bands, Brittany Spanos from Rolling Stone wrote "Timberlake and Michael Jackson set a high bar for what could be attained by solo success in that they not only scored numerous number-one hits but they also crafted the mold for what it meant to be a male pop star", while for Varietys Jeremy Blacklow the singer is "the modern case study". Multiple music publications have deemed Justified as the standard for post boy-band solo albums and teen pop stars seeking credibility. Billboard critics discussed in 2018 whether Timberlake is "the Best Male Pop Star of the 21st century;" those in favor named his crossover appeal, career longevity, showmanship and credibility within the industry among the reasons.

 Achievements 

Throughout his solo career, Timberlake has sold over 32 million albums and 56 million singles globally, and a further 70 million records with NSYNC, making him one of the world's best-selling music artists. Timberlake has won ten Grammy Awards, four Emmy Awards, seven American Music Awards, three Brit Awards, nine Billboard Music Awards, and eleven MTV Video Music Awards. His Grammy wins include categories on the pop, dance and R&B genres; while his Emmy wins consist of two Outstanding Original Music and Lyrics and two Outstanding Guest Actor in a Comedy Series. Timberlake received the Michael Jackson Video Vanguard Award at the 2013 MTV Video Music Awards and the Innovator Award at the 2015 iHeartRadio Music Awards. Among other awards, he won the MTV Video Music Award for Video of the Year for "Mirrors" in 2013 and the Billboard Music Awards for Top Artist with the Top Billboard 200 Album for The 20/20 Experience in 2014. Timberlake received the inaugural Decade Award at the 2016 Teen Choice Awards for his continuous achievements since the release of FutureSex/LoveSounds (2006).

In October 2015, he was inducted into the Memphis Music Hall of Fame, becoming its youngest member. On April 30, 2018, Timberlake reunited with his NSYNC bandmates to receive a star on the Hollywood Walk of Fame. In 2019, Timberlake received a Contemporary Icon Award by the Songwriters Hall of Fame, and an honorary Doctor of Music degree from Berklee College of Music.

All five of Timberlake's studio albums have been certified platinum or better by the RIAA and have received numerous awards. Worldwide sales figures for Justified stand at 10 million copies, FutureSex/LoveSounds at 10 million, and joint sales of The 20/20 Experience and 2 of 2 at 6 million copies. , Timberlake has had seven songs exceed 3 million digital downloads in the United States with "SexyBack" (4.5), "4 Minutes", "Dead and Gone", "Suit & Tie", "Mirrors", "Holy Grail", and "Can't Stop the Feeling!".

According to Billboard, FutureSex/LoveShow was the third highest-grossing concert tour of 2007 and highest solo. The 20/20 Experience World Tour was an international success and became Timberlake's most successful tour to date. The tour was the highest-grossing led by a solo artist in 2014, and one of the highest grossing tours of the decade. For its associated album, The 20/20 Experience, Timberlake was named 2013 Artist of the Year with the top-selling album by iTunes' annual list of best-sellers.

In the United States, five of Timberlake's singles have topped the Billboard Hot 100, his most recent being "Can't Stop the Feeling!". The latter became the 41st Hot 100 number one song to be nominated for an Academy Award for Best Original Song. He topped nine Billboard Year-End charts for 2013, including Billboard 200 Artists and Billboard 200 Albums. For 2014, Timberlake was named Billboard Top Male Artist. Billboard published a list of "Greatest of All Time Pop Songs Artists" in 2017, where Timberlake ranked at number 5, being the top male soloist. The magazine also ranked him 25 on their "The Top 60 Male Artists of All-Time" list in 2018, and 64th on "The Hot 100's Top Artists of All Time". In 2019, Billboard ranked him 20th on their decade-end chart for "Top Artists" of the 2010s, and 74th on "Top 125 Greatest of All Time Artists Chart".

Other ventures
Business ventures
Timberlake has co-owned or provided celebrity endorsement for three restaurants in the United States: "Chi" opened in West Hollywood, California in 2003, and "Destino" and "Southern Hospitality" in New York opened in 2006 and 2007, respectively. In 2005, Timberlake launched the William Rast clothing line with childhood friend Juan ("Trace") Ayala. The 2007 line contained cord jackets, cashmere sweaters, jeans, and polo shirts. The pair reports inspiration from fellow Memphis native Elvis Presley: "Elvis is the perfect mixture of Justin and I", Ayala says. "You can go back and see pictures of him in cowboy boots and a cowboy hat and a nice button-down shirt, but then again you can see him in a tux and a collared shirt with rhinestones on it and slacks. We like to think 'If he was alive today, what would he be wearing?'" Target has announced that a William Rast collection, including denim, outerwear and sportswear for men and women, would launch in December and be available for a month. In 2015, the clothing line earned him a Lord & Taylor's Fashion Oracle Award at the Fashion Group International's Night of The Stars Gala. An avid amateur golfer, in 2007 Timberlake purchased the run-down Big Creek Golf Course in his hometown of Millington, Tennessee, which he redeveloped as the eco-friendly Mirimichi Golf Course at the cost of around $US16 million. It was reopened on July 25, 2009, but closed again on January 15, 2010, for further improvements expected to take six months. In October 2011, Timberlake received the Futures Award at the Environmental Media Awards for his green-conscious golf course. It was reported on November 7, 2014, that Timberlake had sold Mirimichi to Three Star Leasing LLC for $500,000. In October 2018, Timberlake and Levi's debuted their collaborative clothing line collection "Fresh Leaves". In 2022, Justin Timberlake invested in Greenville, South Carolina par-3 golf course Greenville 3's.

Timberlake provides celebrity endorsement for many commercial products, this aspect of his business being managed by IMG since April 2008. Major endorsements in 2009 included Sony electronic products, Givenchy's men's fragrance "Play",
 the Audi A1, Callaway Golf Company products, and in 2011, Myspace. In 2012, he hosted Walmart's annual shareholders meeting, saying, "I buy a lot at Walmart."

In 2014, Timberlake partnered with Sauza Liquors to re-launch his own version of the beverage as part of the Sauza franchise: Sauza 901. In 2016, he became an investor in the beverage company Bai Brands. In 2017, Tiger Woods and Timberlake acquired an ownership stake in the Hurricane Junior Golf Tour.

Timberlake and his wife Jessica Biel are minority owners of the Memphis Grizzlies.

Timberlake is an Air Jordan brand ambassador. His first collection with the brand, the Legend of the Summer collection, debuted on the co-headlining tour of the same name with Jay-Z. These sneakers have gone on to resell for upwards of $10,000. In the lead up to his 2018 Super Bowl Halftime Show, Timberlake worked with famed Nike, Inc. designer Tinker Hatfield to design his own version of the Air Jordan 3. Timberlake debuted the shoe at the halftime show. Timberlake's performance was estimated to be worth $2.86 million in marketing for Nike, and is credited for reigniting interested in the Nike and Air Jordan brand. Nike went on to release several colorways as part of the collaboration with Timberlake.

In May 2022, Timberlake sold the rights to his entire musical catalog, around 200 songs he wrote or co-wrote, to Hipgnosis Song Management for $100 million. The deal covers only pre-existing work, and not work he produces after the deal.

Timberlake had an estimated net-worth of $250 million prior to the Hipgnosis deal, and is now estimated to be worth in excess of $350 million - making him one of the music industry's most valuable solo performers.

Philanthropy
Timberlake has been active in several charitable pursuits, initially through NSYNC's "Challenge for the Children" aimed at a range of charities, and since 2001 through his "Justin Timberlake Foundation", which initially funded music education programs in schools, but now has a much broader agenda. In October 2005, the Grammy Association presented Timberlake with an award for his humanitarian efforts in Tennessee, alongside writer/director Craig Brewer, also a Memphis native.

In November 2007, he donated $100,000 from takings from his Australian tour to Wildlife Warriors founded by Steve Irwin. On March 23, 2008, he donated $100,000 to the Memphis Rock N' Soul Museum and another $100,000 to the Memphis Music Foundation.

On November 12, 2007, the PGA Tour announced that Timberlake, an avid golfer who plays to a six handicap, would become the host of the tour's Las Vegas tournament starting in 2008. With Timberlake's agreement to host the tournament, its name was changed to the Justin Timberlake Shriners Hospitals for Children Open. He played in the celebrity pro-am on the day before the competitive tournament and hosted a charity concert during the week of the tournament. The activity was a success and was repeated in 2009. A review of the value of celebrities to fundraising concluded that Timberlake's contribution to Shriners Hospitals for Children was the single most valuable celebrity endorsement in the U.S. during 2009, and worth over $US9 million. However, in 2012, the event's chair Raoul Frevel told reporters Timberlake would no longer be involved in the event: "We tried everything we could to get him more involved with our kids and the hospitals. But it seemed that when the TV cameras weren't on, he disappeared."

Timberlake often participates in the American Century Championship and the AT&T Pebble Beach Pro-Am. Both annual tournaments raise money for a range of national and local non-profits.

In late 2012, Timberlake and his wife Jessica Biel volunteered in Far Rockaway, Queens over the weekend after Hurricane Sandy. Joined by their friend Timbaland, the couple helped distribute backpacks of supplies to members of the community who were still struggling after the hurricane.

Timberlake has donated items for auction for several charities, including by Ten O'Clock Classics and MusiCares. In 2010, Timberlake participated in the Hope for Haiti Now telethon performing "Hallelujah". The cover was made available for digital download with all proceeds donated to organizations doing relief work in Haiti. In 2016, Timberlake was featured in a new version of "Where Is the Love?". The proceeds of the charity single will go to educational programs. In 2017, Timberlake and Eminem helped raise over $2 million for Manchester Arena bombing victims.

 Book 
On August 10, 2018, the cover page of his book Hindsight & All the Things I Can't See In Front of Me was revealed. The book, launched on October 30, 2018, cover some on and off camera candid images, singer's early life and inspiration for songs. According to publisher HarperCollins, Hindsight includes a "collection of anecdotes, reflections, and observations on his life and work".

Discography

Studio albums
 Justified (2002)
 FutureSex/LoveSounds (2006)
 The 20/20 Experience (2013)
 The 20/20 Experience – 2 of 2 (2013)
 Man of the Woods'' (2018)

Filmography

Films starred

Tours

Headlining tours
 The Justified World Tour (2003–2004)
 FutureSex/LoveShow (2007)
 The 20/20 Experience World Tour (2013–2015)
 The Man of the Woods Tour (2018–2019)

Co-headlining tours
 Justified and Stripped Tour (with Christina Aguilera) (2003)
 Legends of the Summer Stadium Tour (with Jay-Z) (2013)

See also 
 List of best-selling music artists – Artists with sales of over 88 million records worldwide
 Honorific nicknames in popular music
 List of Billboard Social 50 number-one artists
 List of highest-grossing concert tours

References

External links

 
 
 

 
1981 births
Living people
20th-century American male actors
20th-century American singers
21st-century American male actors
21st-century American singers
American child singers
American contemporary R&B singers
American male child actors
American male dancers
American male film actors
American male pop singers
American male singer-songwriters
American male television actors
American male voice actors
American philanthropists
American restaurateurs
American tenors
Brit Award winners
Businesspeople from Tennessee
Child pop musicians
Dance-pop musicians
Grammy Award winners for dance and electronic music
Grammy Award winners for rap music
Jive Records artists
Male actors from Tennessee
Mouseketeers
MTV Europe Music Award winners
NSYNC members
People from Shelby County, Tennessee
People named in the Paradise Papers
Primetime Emmy Award winners
RCA Records artists
Record producers from Tennessee
Singers from Memphis, Tennessee
Singer-songwriters from Tennessee
World Music Awards winners
Writers from Memphis, Tennessee